Events from the year 1395 in Ireland.

Incumbent
Lord: Richard II

Events

Defeat of Leinster Irish under Art Mór Mac Murchadha Caomhánach, King of Leinster and submission of nearly all Irish and rebel English chiefs to King Richard II of England.
15 May – Richard leaves Ireland, having achieved his objectives.

Births

Deaths

References

 
1390s in Ireland
Ireland
Years of the 14th century in Ireland